Twilight language is a rendering of the Sanskrit term  (written also , , ; , THL gongpé ké) or of their modern Indic equivalents (especially in Bengali, Odia, Assamese, Maithili, Hindi, Nepali, Braj Bhasha and Khariboli).

As popularized by Roderick Bucknell and Martin Stuart-Fox in The Twilight Language: Explorations in Buddhist Meditation and Symbolism in 1986, the notion of "twilight language" is a supposed polysemic language and communication system associated with tantric traditions in Vajrayana Buddhism and Hinduism. It includes visual communication, verbal communication and nonverbal communication. Tantric texts are often written in a form of the twilight language that is incomprehensible to the uninitiated reader. As part of an esoteric tradition of initiation, the texts are not to be employed by those without an experienced guide and the use of the twilight language ensures that the uninitiated do not easily gain access to the knowledge contained in these works.

The phrase "twilight language" has subsequently been adopted by some other Western writers. For example, according to Judith Simmer-Brown:

Usage

In the Vajrayana tradition
As Bucknell and Stuart-Fox state:

Numbers, numerology and the spirituality of numerals is key to the twilight language and endemic to Vajrayana, as it is throughout Indian religions. Numbers that are particularly frequent in classification are three, five and nine. As Bucknell and Stuart-Fox state:

In the Pali Canon
Although twilight language is primarily a feature of esoteric traditions such as the Vajrayana, Bucknell and Stuart-Fox cite the Thai bhikkhu Buddhadasa as having explored "the importance of symbolic language in the Pali Canon ... in a number of lectures and publications."

In Sonepur literature
Sonepur, Odisha and its literature is championed by such as Charyapada, Matsyendranath, Daripada and other Naths:

Refutation of the translation of term as "twilight language"
In 1970, Mircea Eliade presented evidence that the concept of "twilight" (or "crepuscular") language is based on a translation error.  According to Eliade, in 1916 Haraprasād Shāstri proposed the translation of "twilight language". However, in 1928 Vidhushekar Shāstri debunked that translation, showing that the term is based on a shortened form of the word sandhāya, which can be translated as "having in view", "intending", or "with regard to". Eliade concludes that: "Hence there is no reference to the idea of a 'twilight language'." He continues by speculating on how the term came to be corrupted by scribes who read the familiar word sandhyā ("crepuscular") for the original sandhā.  Eliade therefore translates the phrase as "Intentional Language". Staal explains, "sandhā means esoteric meaning, as contrasted with prima facie or superficial meaning," and suggests to translate sandhābhāsā as "secret language".

See also
 Conceptual metaphor
 Image schema
 Language of the birds
 Visual language
 Visual thinking

Notes

References

Citations

Sources

Further reading
  
  
  
   
  
 
 
 

Language and mysticism
Semantics
Tantra
Vajrayana